UCR may refer to:

 Unclassified county road, an obsolete term for a green lane (road) in England and Wales
 Under color removal in printing
 Unified Cornish Revised, a variety of the Cornish language
 Uniform Crime Reports
 Union centriste et républicaine (Centrist and Republican Union), group of the French senate
 Unión Cívica Radical (Radical Civic Union), an Argentine political party
 University Center Rochester in Minnesota
 University of California, Riverside
 University of Costa Rica
 University College Roosevelt, Middelburg, The Netherlands
 Upper Chattahoochee Riverkeeper, an environmental advocacy organization in Georgia, USA
 Urea-creatinine ratio
 Usual, customary and reasonable, a method of generating health care prices